Raraju is a 1984 Telugu film directed by G. Rammohan Rao and produced by Vadde Sobhanadri. The film stars Krishnam Raju, Vijayashanti, Sharada, Suman, Siva Krishna, Jaggayya and Kaikala Satyanarayana in the lead roles. The film has music composed by J. V. Raghavulu.

Cast
Krishnam Raju as Raraju
Vijayashanti
Sharada  as Parvati
Suman as Venu
Siva Krishna as Krishna Moorti
Jaggayya as Ravindra
Kaikala Satyanarayana as Mastan Rao
Jayanthi as Kalyani
Prabhakar Reddy as Parvati's father
Mucherla Aruna as Jyoti
Giri Babu as Mastan Rao's henchman
Nutan Prasad as Patrudu
Sri Lakshmi as Fakiramma
Raavi Kondala Rao
Silk Smitha

References 

1984 films
1980s Telugu-language films
Indian action films
Films scored by J. V. Raghavulu
Indian courtroom films
Films set in forests
1984 action films